was a Japanese freestyle swimmer. At the 1936 Olympics he won a gold medal in the 4 × 200 m relay, setting a new world record. In the individual 100 m race he finished almost simultaneously with Masanori Yusa and Shigeo Arai and was placed fourth, although photographs suggest he was second.

Taguchi graduated from the Rikkyo University, and later worked at a Daimaru department store and coached swimming at a local Daimaru swimming club. He was recruited in 1961 to prepare the national swimming team for the 1964 Tokyo Olympics.

References

External links 

 

1916 births
1982 deaths
Olympic swimmers of Japan
Olympic gold medalists for Japan
Swimmers at the 1936 Summer Olympics
World record setters in swimming
Japanese male freestyle swimmers
Rikkyo University alumni

Medalists at the 1936 Summer Olympics
Olympic gold medalists in swimming
20th-century Japanese people